Robert Lee Oliver (February 8, 1943 – April 19, 2020) was an American professional baseball first baseman and outfielder, who played in Major League Baseball (MLB) for the Pittsburgh Pirates (1965), Kansas City Royals (1969–72), California Angels (1972–74), Baltimore Orioles (1974), and New York Yankees (1975). He batted and threw right-handed.

Career

Minor leagues
Born in Shreveport, Louisiana, Oliver lettered in baseball and basketball at Highlands High School in North Highlands, California, a suburb of Sacramento. After graduating in 1961, he played college baseball at American River College, where he was heavily scouted. Signed by the Pittsburgh Pirates before the 1963 season, Oliver played in the Pirates' farm system for four seasons, with a late call-up in 1965, during which he made his major league debut. Oliver was traded to the Minnesota Twins and spent two more seasons in Minor League Baseball (MiLB).

Major leagues
Oliver made the big leagues for good in 1969, having been selected by the Kansas City Royals in the previous October's expansion draft. Playing on a young team that included fellow rookies Pat Kelly and Lou Piniella — the eventual American League (AL) Rookie of the Year — Oliver batted .254, with 13 home runs, and 43 runs batted in (RBI), in 118 games played. That year, he achieved two firsts in Royals history: 1) He was the first Royal to collect six hits in a nine-inning game (only two other Royals, Kevin Seitzer in 1987 and Joe Randa in 2004, have since accomplished this feat), with a 6-for-6 performance in a May 4 victory over the California Angels; and 2) He hit the Royals' first-ever grand slam, the shot coming off Jim Bouton in the first game of a July 4 doubleheader against the American League's other 1969 expansion team, the Seattle Pilots.

1970 was a breakout year for Oliver; he established career highs in home runs (27),RBI (99), and runs scored (83). Oliver enjoyed two more solid seasons: 1972 (during which he was traded to the California Angels), batting .269, with 20 home runs, and 76 RBI; and 1973, batting .265, with 18 home runs, and 89 RBI, while splitting his time as a utility player. The Baltimore Orioles acquired him for the 1974 stretch drive; Oliver appeared in nine games for the team. His contract was purchased by the New York Yankees from the Orioles on December 1, 1974, but he only saw limited duty in 1975. During his career, Oliver batted .256, with 94 home runs, and 419 RBI, in 847 games played.

Other interests and death
While a member of the California Angels, Oliver moonlighted as a police officer for the Santa Ana Police Department. In the offseason he was a school resource officer.

Oliver managed the Sacramento Steelheads, in 1999. He has also worked at two baseball schools in Sacramento County: operating his own Baseball Academy in Sacramento, as well as working as a hitting instructor at Dusty Baker's Baseball Camp in Rancho Cordova.

Oliver's son Darren also played in MLB, from 1993–2013. Both father and son are former teammates of Nolan Ryan: Bob from 1972 to 1974, and Darren as a rookie with the Texas Rangers in 1993 (Ryan's final major league season).

Oliver died on April 19, 2020, at the age of 77, in Rio Linda, California.

See also
List of Major League Baseball single-game hits leaders

References

External links

Bob Oliver at SABR (Baseball BioProject)
Bob Oliver at Pura Pelota (Venezuelan Professional Baseball League)

1943 births
2020 deaths
African-American baseball players
American expatriate baseball players in Mexico
American River Beavers baseball players
Angeles de Puebla players
Asheville Tourists players
Baltimore Orioles players
Baseball players from Shreveport, Louisiana
California Angels players
Cardenales de Lara players
Columbus Clippers players
Columbus Jets players
Criollos de Caguas players
Denver Bears players
Florida Instructional League Pirates players
Florida Instructional League Royals players
Gastonia Pirates players
Iowa Oaks players
Kansas City Royals players
Kinston Eagles players
Liga de Béisbol Profesional Roberto Clemente infielders
Liga de Béisbol Profesional Roberto Clemente outfielders
Macon Peaches players
Major League Baseball first basemen
Major League Baseball outfielders
Navegantes del Magallanes players
American expatriate baseball players in Venezuela
New York Yankees players
Oklahoma City 89ers players
Omaha Royals players
Pittsburgh Pirates players
Rojos del Águila de Veracruz players
20th-century African-American sportspeople
21st-century African-American people
American expatriate baseball players in Nicaragua
African-American police officers
American school police officers